Erika Radermacher (born 16 April 1936) is a German pianist, soprano and composer.

Biography
Erika Radermacher was born in Eschweiler, near Aachen. She studied music with Else Schmitz-Gohr in Cologne, Bruno Seidlhofer in Vienna and voice with Sylvia Gähwiller in Zurich. After completing her studies, she performed as a soloist and chamber musician in Europe.

Radermaker married Urs Peter Schneider and settled in Bern and Biel, where she taught at the Conservatory of Music in Bern and sang as a soprano with the Ensemble Neue Horizonte Bern. After 1970 she became more interested in composition.

She works as a lecturer in piano at the Bern University of Arts and also teaches piano, theory and improvisation in Sofia, Bulgaria.

Honors and awards
Two prizes, BAT competition for new chamber music, 1982
Music Prize of the Canton of Bern, 1983 (with Schneider)
Prize of the German Culture Industry Group
First Prize in the Summer Academy in Salzburg
Beethoven Competition prize in Vienna
Mozart Prize in Dortmund
1963 Austrian State Prize, 1963

Discography
Radermaker's work has been recorded and issued on CD, including:
Robert Walser in der Schweizer Musik (Musiques Suisses Nr. 6231, 2005) Artists: Schneider, Urs Peter; Rader, Erika
Historic Recordings 1968-1998, New Horizons Ensemble (music scene in Switzerland - Grammont Portrait No. CTS-M 76, 2002) Artists:
Ensemble Neue Horizonte Bern 
Urs Peter Schneider (Edition Wandelweiser Records No. 101, 2001) Artists: Schneider, Urs Peter; Rader, Erika
Im Innern das Zitat, Improvisationen (Deputy / asm / Records Unit No. 012 / UTR4132, 2000) Artists: Rader, Erika; Weber, Katharina

References

External links
List of works

1936 births
Living people
20th-century classical composers
German music educators
German women classical composers
20th-century German composers
Women music educators
Women classical composers
German classical composers
20th-century women composers
20th-century German women